Yairo Yesid Moreno Berrío (born 4 April 1995) is a Colombian professional footballer who plays as a winger and left-back for Liga MX club León and the Colombia national team.

International
Moreno made his senior national team debut on 6 September 2019 in a friendly against Brazil, when he replaced Juan Cuadrado in the 87th minute.

Honours

Club
León
Liga MX: Guardianes 2020

References

External links
 

1995 births
Living people
Colombian footballers
Colombia international footballers
Sportspeople from Antioquia Department
Independiente Medellín footballers
América de Cali footballers
Envigado F.C. players
Categoría Primera A players
Colombian expatriate footballers
Expatriate footballers in Mexico
Colombian expatriate sportspeople in Mexico
Club León footballers
Liga MX players
Association football midfielders
2021 Copa América players